The Al-Kafaàt University (AKU) is a private and independent university in Beirut, Lebanon.  It was founded in 1999 by the Al Kafaàt Foundation. The university is managed by a Board of Trustees, appointed by the Al-Kafaàt Foundation's Board of Trustees.

Overview
The university is a fully accredited institution of higher education. It was established by the Al-Kafaàt Foundation in 1999.

History
In 1957, Nadeem Shwayri founded the Al-Kafaàt Foundation, a non-profit and non-governmental development organization whose mission is to preserve the dignity of people with challenges. 
With his wife Lily, they set the mission of the foundation to serve the most challenged in Lebanon. 
Today the Al-Kafatàt Foundation delivers education and rehabilitation to over 4,500 people across seven centers, with a workforce of over 800 employees. The Al-Kafaàt Foundation is governed by a Board of Trustees.

The Al-Kafaàt Foundation  is a founding member of the World Commission on Vocational Rehabilitation (1963), member of the International Cerebral Palsy Society (1979), member of Inclusion International (1981), recipient of the Rehabilitation International Presidential Award (1984), three times recipient of the Lebanese Order of the Cedars (Knight 1972, Officer 1997, and Commander 2007), and recipient of the Antiochian Orthodox Archdiocese of North America Antonian Gold Medal (2010).

In the mid 1990s, the Al-Kafaàt Foundation launched the Al-Kafaàt Institution of Higher Education, which obtained the Ministry of Higher Education's approval in 1999. The Al Kafaàt Foundation then developed the School of Technology and the School of Education, covering ten fields of study. In 2005, the Al-Kafaàt University was accredited by the Ministry of Education, after developing the School of Business and the School of Fine Arts.  
The university campus, which spreads over an area of 60,000 square meters, is located in Ain-Saadeh, ten kilometers away from the Lebanese capital city, Beirut.  The campus includes nine buildings consisting of 90 classrooms, 25 laboratories, 30 industrial workshops, 300 residential rooms, multipurpose halls, the Al-Kafaàt Campus Restaurant, the Al-Kafaàt Theater, and the Al-Kafaàt Sports Club.

Faculties
 Computer Science
 Electronics
 Mechanics
 Banking and Finance
 Hotel Management
 Food Industries
 Audio Visual (Cinema)
 Interior Design
 Advertising and Graphic Design
 Preschool and Elementary Education
 Special Education
 Gerontology and proximity care

References

http://aku.edu.lb
http://al-kafaat.org

External links
 Official website

Educational institutions established in 1999
Education in Beirut
Kafaat
1999 establishments in Lebanon
Organisations based in Beirut